This Way Is My Way is the second studio album by Canadian country pop artist Anne Murray and was released in 1969 on Capitol Records. Initially the album was available only in Canada. It was later made available in the U.S after Murray's chart success there in the 1970s. The album included recordings of songs by Eric Andersen, Gene MacLellan, and Bob Dylan. A single release of "Snowbird" was issued in the U.S. in 1970, where it reached the top ten and started Murray's career there. The album peaked at No.13 on the Canadian RPM album chart on 20 February 1971.

Buddy Cage plays pedal steel guitar on this album. He went on to join the New Riders of the Purple Sage.
The album cover features Murray sitting at the base of Albion Falls in Hamilton, Ontario.

Track listing

Personnel
Anne Murray - vocals
Amos Garrett - guitar
Brian Ahern - guitar
Buddy Cage - pedal steel

Reference Source: Re-release of the original This is My Way album in a remastered CD series of Anne Murray albums originally released in long playing vinyl record form. This is My Way was Murray's first album for Capitol Records.  EMI Canada 72434 35467 2 9

1969 albums
Anne Murray albums
Albums produced by Brian Ahern (producer)
Capitol Records albums